Monirul Haque Sakku is a Bangladeshi politician and the first and immediate past mayor of the Cumilla City Corporation as a candidate of Bangladesh Nationalist party. On 19 May 2022, he has been expelled permanently from BNP for breaching party discipline.

Career 
On 7 January 2008, Anti-Corruption Commission (Bangladesh) sued Sakku and his wife for illegal wealth. He was charged on 4 February 2016 but his wife's, Afroza Jasmine, was dropped. On 22 November 2017 a trial court found him innocent of all charges.

On 5 January 2012, Sakku was elected Mayor of Comilla on a nomination of Citizens Committee. He is a former President of Comilla City unit of Bangladesh Nationalist Party. He had been expelled from the Party.

Sakku was nominated by Bangladesh Nationalist Party to contest the Mayoral election in Comilla in 2017. He was re-elected Mayor on 31 March 2017. A correspondent of The Daily Star reported seeing some activists of Awami League stuff ballots for their candidate. His candidacy was supported by Bangladesh Jamaat-e-Islami.

References 

Living people
People from Comilla District
Bangladesh Nationalist Party politicians
Mayors of Comilla
Year of birth missing (living people)
Place of birth missing (living people)